is the 45th single by the Japanese idol girl group AKB48. It was released in Japan on August 31, 2016. It was number-one on the Oricon Weekly Singles Chart with 1,177,769 copies sold. The song also reached number-one on the Billboard Japan Hot 100.

Background 
The member lineup for the title track and several supporting B-sides was determined by the results from the annual election held by AKB48 and its several sister groups. Rino Sashihara, having won the election for the third time, serves as the center (choreography center) in the title song.

Track listing

Type-A

Type-B

Type-C

Type-D

Type-E

Theater Edition

Personnel

Love Trip and Shiawase wo Wakenasai 
16 members, ranked 1st to 16th of the 45th single general election, were selected for the song. The choreography center is Rino Sashihara.

 AKB48 Team A: Haruka Shimazaki, Yui Yokoyama, Haruna Kojima
 AKB48 Team A/HKT48 Team KIV: Sakura Miyawaki
 AKB48 Team K: Tomu Muto, Mion Mukaichi
 AKB48 Team K/HKT48 Team H: Haruka Kodama
 AKB48 Team B/NGT48 Team NIII: Yuki Kashiwagi
 AKB48 Team B: Mayu Watanabe
 AKB48 Team 4: Nana Okada, Juri Takahashi
 SKE48 Team S: Jurina Matsui
 SKE48 Team E: Akari Suda
 NMB48 Team N: Sayaka Yamamoto
 HKT48 Team H: Rino Sashihara
 NGT48 Team NIII: Rie Kitahara

Hikari to Kage no Hibi 
Reference

 AKB48 Team A: Anna Iriyama, Yui Yokoyama
 AKB48 Team A/HKT48 Team KIV: Sakura Miyawaki
 AKB48 Team A/NMB48 Team M: Miru Shiroma
 AKB48 Team K/HKT48 Team H: Haruka Kodama
 AKB48 Team B: Mayu Watanabe
 AKB48 Team B/NGT48 Team NIII: Yuki Kashiwagi
 AKB48 Team 4/SKE48 Team S: Ryoha Kitagawa
 SKE48 Team S: Jurina Matsui
 SKE48 Team KII: Akane Takayanagi
 NMB48 Team N: Sayaka Yamamoto
 NMB48 Team M: Fuuko Yagura
 HKT48 Team H: Rino Sashihara
 NGT48 Team NIII: Rie Kitahara, Minami Kato, Moeka Takakura

Densetsu no Sakana 
16 members, ranked 17th to 32nd of the 45th single general election, are called Under Girls and sing this song.

 AKB48 Team A: Anna Iriyama
 AKB48 Team A/NMB48 Team M: Miru Shiroma
 AKB48 Team K: Minami Minegishi
 AKB48 Team B: Rena Katō, Ryōka Ōshima
 AKB48 Team B/HKT48 Team H: Nako Yabuki
 AKB48 Team 4: Mako Kojima, Haruka Komiyama, Saya Kawamoto
 AKB48 Team 4/HKT48 KIV: Mio Tomonaga
 SKE48 Team KII: Akane Takayanagi, Mina Ōba, Nao Furuhata, Sarina Sōda, Saki Takeuchi
 NMB48 Team M: Ayaka Okita

Shinka Shite Nējan 
16 members, ranked 33rd to 48th of the 45th single general election, are called Next Girls and sing this song.

 AKB48 Team A: Yukari Sasaki
 AKB48 Team K: Shinobu Mogi
 AKB48 Team B: Yuria Kizaki
 AKB48 Team 8: Narumi Kuranoo
 SKE48 Team KII: Yuna Ego
 NMB48 Team N: Ririka Sutō
 NMB48 Team M: Fūko Yagura, Reina Fujie
 NMB48 Team BII: Shu Yabushita
 HKT48 Team H: Meru Tashima, Miku Tanaka, Natsumi Matsuoka, Yuriya Inoue
 HKT48 Team KIV: Aoi Motomura,  Mai Fuchigami, Asuka Tomiyoshi

Kishi ga Mieru Umi Kara 
16 members, ranked 49th to 64th of the 45th single general election, are called Future Girls and sing this song.

 AKB48 Team A: Nana Owada
 AKB48 Team 4: Saho Iwatate, Ayaka Okada, Miki Nishino
 AKB48 Team 4/SKE48 Team S: Ryoha Kitagawa
 AKB48 Team 4/NMB48 Team BII: Nagisa Shibuya
 SKE48 Team S: Haruka Futamura, Mai Takeuchi
 SKE48 Team E: Marika Tani, Mei Sakai
 NMB48 Team N: Yūri Ōta
 HKT48 Team H: Yui Kōjina, Riko Sakaguchi, Hiroka Komada
 HKT48 Team KIV: Madoka Moriyasu, Nao Ueki

2016 Nen no Invitation 
16 members, ranked 65th to 80th of the 45th single general election, are called Upcoming Girls and sing this song.

 AKB48 Team A: Megu Taniguchi, Miho Miyazaki
 AKB48 TeamB/Team 8: Nagisa Sakaguchi
 AKB48 Team 4: Miyū Ōmori
 SKE48 Team S: Ami Miyamae, Suzuran Yamauchi
 SKE48 Team KII: Yuzuki Hidaka
 SKE48 Team E: Haruka Kumazaki, Kanon Kimoto, Natsuki Kamata, Sumire Satō
 NMB48 Team N: Rika Kishino, Akari Yoshida
 HKT48 Team H: Yuka Akiyoshi
 HKT48 Team KIV: Anna Murashige
 NGT48 Team NIII: Minami Katō

Hikari no Naka e 
Baito AKB Paruru Senbatsu members.

 AKB48 Team A: Haruka Shimazaki
 Fuyuka Shigefuji
 Yūka Hinode

Black Flower 
This song is used as the featured song for Crow's Blood. The word in parenthesis is the role name.

 AKB48 Team A: Anna Iriyama (Aoi Nojiri), Yui Yokoyama (Chisa Furugōri)
 AKB48 Team A/HKT48 Team KIV: Sakura Miyawaki (Maki Togawa)
 AKB48 Team K: Mion Mukaichi (Nami Katayama)
 AKB48 Team B: Mayu Watanabe (Kaoru Isozaki), Yuria Kizaki (Hikari Yanaka), Rena Katō (Keiko Yodogawa)
 AKB48 Team B/NGT48 Team NIII: Yuki Kashiwagi (Mai Utsui)
 SKE48 Team S: Jurina Matsui (Shinobu Matsumura)

Release history

Charts

Works cited

References

External links
 Type A Limited Edition — AKB48 discography on the official website

AKB48 songs
2016 singles
2016 songs
Songs with lyrics by Yasushi Akimoto
King Records (Japan) singles
Oricon Weekly number-one singles
Billboard Japan Hot 100 number-one singles
Japanese television drama theme songs